Ruthville is an unincorporated community in Charles City County, Virginia, United States. The community was the central point of the county's free African American population for many years, even before the Civil War (1861-1865). Following Emancipation, the crossroads community included the Mercantile Cooperative Company and Ruthville Training School. The United Sorghum Growers Club also met here. Earlier known by several other names, the name "Ruthville" recalls local resident Ruth Brown. Her name was selected when the Post Office was established there in 1880.

Unincorporated communities in Charles City County, Virginia
Unincorporated communities in Virginia